Fabrizio is an Italian first name, from the Latin word "Faber" meaning "smith" and may refer to:

 Fabrizio Barbazza (born 1963), Italian Formula One driver
 Fabrizio Barca (born 1954), Italian politician
 Fabrizio Brienza (born 1969), Italian model and actor
 Fabrizio Castori (born 1954), Italian football coach
 Fabrizio De André (1940–1999), Italian singer-songwriter
 Fabrizio Faniello (born 1981), Maltese singer
 Fabrizio Giovanardi (born 1966), Italian racing driver
 Fabrizio Miccoli (born 1979), Italian football player
 Fabrizio Moreira (born 1982), Ecuadorian politician
 Fabrizio Moretti (born 1980), Brazilian-American drummer in the band The Strokes
 Fabrizio Moretti (art dealer) (born 1976), Italian art dealer
 Fabrizio Moro (born 1975), Italian singer-songwriter
 Fabrizio Nieva (born 1964), Argentine boxer
 Fabrizio Ravanelli (born 1968), Italian football player
 Fabrizio Romano (born 1993), Italian journalist
 Fabrizio Rongione (born 1973), Belgian screenwriter, film producer and actor
 Fabrizio Ruffo (1744–1827), Neapolitan cardinal and politician
 Fabrizio Saccomanni (1942–2019), Italian politician

See also 
 Fabricius (disambiguation)
 Fabritius (disambiguation)

Italian-language surnames
Italian masculine given names